Lachnodius is a genus of eriococcid scales, or felt scale insects, in the family Eriococcidae. There are at least 10 described species in Lachnodius, found in Australia.

Species
These species belong to the genus Lachnodius:

 Lachnodius brimblecombei Beardsley, Gullan & Hardy, 2019
 Lachnodius eucalypti (Maskell, 1892)
 Lachnodius froggatti Beardsley, Gullan & Hardy, 2019
 Lachnodius hirsutus (Froggatt, 1921)
 Lachnodius lectularius Maskell, 1896
 Lachnodius maculosus Beardsley, Gullan & Hardy, 2019
 Lachnodius melliodorae Beardsley, Gullan & Hardy, 2019
 Lachnodius newi Beardsley, Gullan & Hardy, 2019
 Lachnodius parathrix Beardsley, Gullan & Hardy, 2019
 Lachnodius sealakeensis Gullan & Hardy, 2019

References

Further reading

 

Sternorrhyncha genera
Eriococcidae